Darell Scott (born March 15, 1986) is a former American football defensive tackle. He was drafted by the St. Louis Rams in the fourth round of the 2009 NFL Draft. He played college football at Clemson.

Early years
Scott was a three-year starter at Ridge View High School in Columbia, South Carolina where he had 242 career tackles, 31 tackles for loss, seven sacks, 35 quarterback pressures, four caused fumbles, six recovered fumbles, and one defensive touchdown. He was named team defensive MVP after his sophomore, junior, and senior seasons. As a senior, he had 101 tackles, 12 tackles for loss, and a 90-percent grade as a lineman on offense. Scott had 70 tackles, five tackles for loss, three caused fumbles, and three recovered fumbles as a junior and had 71 tackles and 13 tackles for loss as a sophomore. After his senior year he was a Shrine Bowl selection

College career
Scott started his final 38 games, appearing in 50 contests while participating in a total of 1,501 plays recording 161 tackles (103 solo) with nine sacks, 18.5 stops for losses and 36 quarterback pressures and had one interception, two pass deflections, two fumble recoveries and a forced fumble.

He red-shirted as a freshman in 2004. In the 2005 football season he had 18 tackles in nine game and had two sacks and 10 quarterback pressure and recovered two fumbles. 2006: Started all 13 games at defensive tackle and recorded 54 tackles. In 2007, he was third among Tiger defensive linemen in tackles (50) while starting all 13 games for and also had three sacks, third-most on the team. As a senior in 2008 Scott had 39 tackles (7.5 for losses) and one sack while playing and starting all 12 games while deflecting a pass and recovering a fumble.

Professional career

Pre-draft measurables

St. Louis Rams
He was drafted by the Rams in the fourth round of the 2009 NFL Draft on April 26, 2009. Scott was on the active roster since the beginning of the 2009 NFL season, but was inactive from Week 2 through Week 6. By week 11 he was the a starting defensive tackle for the Rams. Scott was released by the Rams on September 13, 2012.

References

External links
Clemson Tigers bio

1986 births
Living people
American football defensive tackles
Clemson Tigers football players
St. Louis Rams players